The 2017 Brazilian Grand Prix (formally known as the Formula 1 Grande Prêmio Heineken do Brasil 2017) was a Formula One motor race held on 12 November 2017 at the Autódromo José Carlos Pace in the Interlagos neighborhood of São Paulo, Brazil.

Mercedes driver Valtteri Bottas started from pole position with Ferrari's Sebastian Vettel and Kimi Räikkönen behind, after World Champion Lewis Hamilton crashed out of qualifying early and started from the pit lane. Vettel overtook Bottas on the first corner, after which he set the pace through most of the race. Vettel won the Grand Prix, followed by Bottas and Räikkönen. Hamilton eventually climbed to fourth, closing to less than one second of a podium finish.

Report

Free practice
The three free practice session demonstrated very tight competition between Ferrari and Mercedes. In first and second free practice, Lewis Hamilton was quickest, with both Ferraris and both Red Bulls within one second. Felipe Massa and Fernando Alonso were notably strong in these sessions. In the third session, the order was similar. However, Valtteri Bottas pipped Hamilton's best time by three thousands of a second; and neither Max Verstappen nor Massa put in a strong lap. In the final practice round, less than a tenth of a second separated the two Mercedes and two Ferraris.

The first practice session saw George Russell's Formula One debut appearance. There was also an unusual appearance of a test driver (Antonio Giovinazzi) in the second practice session (usually, any test drivers that participate in a racing weekend, do so in the first practice session).

Qualifying
Qualifying began in a dramatic fashion as World Champion Hamilton lost the back end of the car with over-steer, seemingly due to a driver error, crashing to retire from Q1 without setting a lap time. Räikkönen was fastest in Q1 and Vettel in Q2. In the final qualifying session, however, Bottas took pole position. Vettel qualified a close second, followed by Räikkönen, Verstappen and Daniel Ricciardo. Ricciardo took a 10-place grid penalty for exceeding his quota of power unit components and started 14th on the grid. Hamilton elected to change his gearbox and power unit, so started the race from the pit lane.

Race
Vettel achieved a good start during the second phase of clutch control to overtake Bottas on the first corner. There were numerous retirements due to collisions on the first lap. Romain Grosjean lost the back end, clipping Esteban Ocon off the track. Ocon's resultant retirement ended his record streak of 27 races finished from his Formula One debut. Stoffel Vandoorne and Kevin Magnussen also retired due to a collision on the first lap.

Hamilton, starting from the pit lane, implemented an inverted tyre strategy running to lap 44 on one set of soft tyres. After overtaking the back-markers and mid-field, he fell into first place as the leading cars – predominantly on one-stop strategies – pitted. Hamilton's only pit-stop positioned him fifth, after which he overtook Verstappen and was briefly able to challenge Räikkönen for the podium, but unable to overtake Raikkonen in third. Ricciardo also battled up to sixth after starting fifteenth on the grid and dropping to seventeenth as collateral of the Vandoorne-Magnussen collision.

Setting the pace through most of the race, Vettel won the Grand Prix, followed by Bottas and Räikkönen. Including Hamilton, the top four finished within the space of 5.5 seconds, with the two Red Bulls more than 30 seconds behind. The following three positions also carried a race-long battle to the finish line, finishing within 1 second of each other. Initially overtaking on lap 5 (as the safety car was pulling into pitlane), Massa held off Alonso who remained close throughout the race. Sergio Pérez also caught up to these two racers to cross the finish line barely behind Alonso.

Classification

Qualifying

Notes
 – Daniel Ricciardo received a 10-place grid penalty for exceeding his quota of power unit components.
 – Brendon Hartley received a 10-place grid penalty for exceeding his quota of power unit components.
 – Pierre Gasly received a 25-place grid penalty for exceeding his quota of power unit components.
 – Lance Stroll received a 5-place grid penalty for an unscheduled gearbox change. 
 – Marcus Ericsson received a 5-place grid penalty for an unscheduled gearbox change. 
 – Lewis Hamilton failed to set a time within the 107% requirement, but received permission from the stewards to start the race. He also started from the pit lane due to a gearbox and power unit changes.

Race

Championship standings after the race

Drivers' Championship standings

Constructors' Championship standings

 Note: Only the top five positions are included for the sets of standings.
 Bold text indicates the 2017 World Champions.

References

External links

Brazilian
Brazilian Grand Prix
2017 in Brazilian motorsport
Brazilian Grand Prix